The 2010–11 OHL season was the 31st season of the Ontario Hockey League (OHL). Twenty teams played 68 games each during the regular season schedule, which started on September 23, 2010 and ended on March 20, 2011. The playoffs began on March 24, 2011 and ended on May 15, 2011, with the Owen Sound Attack winning the J. Ross Robertson Cup, and a berth in the 2011 Memorial Cup, hosted by the Mississauga St. Michael's Majors of the OHL in Mississauga, Ontario.

Regular season

Final standings
Note: DIV = Division; GP = Games played; W = Wins; L = Losses; OTL = Overtime losses; SL = Shootout losses; GF = Goals for; GA = Goals against; PTS = Points; x = clinched playoff berth; y = clinched division title; z = clinched conference title

Eastern conference

Western conference

Scoring leaders
Note: GP = Games played; G = Goals; A = Assists; Pts = Points; PIM = Penalty minutes

Leading goaltenders
Note: GP = Games played; Mins = Minutes played; W = Wins; L = Losses: OTL = Overtime losses; SL = Shootout losses; GA = Goals Allowed; SO = Shutouts; GAA = Goals against average

Playoffs

Conference quarterfinals

Eastern conference

(1) Mississauga Majors vs. (8) Belleville Bulls

(2) Ottawa 67's vs. (7) Sudbury Wolves

(3) Niagara IceDogs vs. (6) Brampton Battalion

(4) Oshawa Generals vs. (5) Kingston Frontenacs

Western conference

(1) Owen Sound Attack vs. (8) London Knights

(2) Saginaw Spirit vs. (7) Guelph Storm

(3) Kitchener Rangers vs. (6) Plymouth Whalers

(4) Windsor Spitfires vs. (5) Erie Otters

Conference semifinals

Eastern conference

(1) Mississauga Majors vs. (7) Sudbury Wolves

(3) Niagara IceDogs vs. (4) Oshawa Generals

Western conference

(1) Owen Sound Attack vs. (6) Plymouth Whalers

(2) Saginaw Spirit vs. (4) Windsor Spitfires

Conference finals

Eastern conference

(1) Mississauga Majors vs. (3) Niagara IceDogs

Western conference

(1) Owen Sound Attack vs. (4) Windsor Spitfires

J. Ross Robertson Cup

(E1) Mississauga Majors vs. (W1) Owen Sound Attack

J. Ross Robertson Cup Champions Roster

Playoff scoring leaders
Note: GP = Games played; G = Goals; A = Assists; Pts = Points; PIM = Penalty minutes

Playoff leading goaltenders
Note: GP = Games played; Mins = Minutes played; W = Wins; L = Losses; GA = Goals Allowed; SO = Shutouts; SV& = Save percentage; GAA = Goals against average

All-Star teams
The OHL All-Star Teams were selected by the OHL's General Managers.

First team
Joey Hishon, Centre, Owen Sound Attack
Garrett Wilson, Left Wing, Owen Sound Attack
Tyler Toffoli, Right wing, Ottawa 67's
Ryan Ellis, Defence, Windsor Spitfires
Ryan Murphy, Defence, Kitchener Rangers
Mark Visentin, Goalie, Niagara IceDogs
Mark Reeds, Coach, Owen Sound Attack

Second team
Ryan Strome, Centre, Niagara IceDogs
Marcus Foligno, Left Wing, Sudbury Wolves
Jason Akeson, Right wing, Kitchener Rangers
Dougie Hamilton, Defence, Niagara IceDogs
Marc Cantin, Defence, Mississauga St. Michael's Majors
J. P. Anderson, Goalie, Mississauga St. Michael's Majors
Dave Cameron, Coach, Mississauga St. Michael's Majors

Third team
Casey Cizikas, Centre, Mississauga St. Michael's Majors
Josh Shalla, Left Wing, Saginaw Spirit
Christian Thomas, Right wing, Oshawa Generals
Brett Flemming, Defence, Mississauga St. Michael's Majors
Jesse Blacker, Defence, Owen Sound Attack
Petr Mrazek, Goalie, Ottawa 67's
Mike Vellucci, Coach, Plymouth Whalers

Awards

2011 OHL Priority Selection
On May 7, 2011, the OHL conducted the 2011 Ontario Hockey League Priority Selection. The Barrie Colts held the first overall pick in the draft, and selected Aaron Ekblad from the Sun County Panthers. Ekblad was awarded the Jack Ferguson Award, awarded to the top pick in the draft.

Below are the players who were selected in the first round of the 2011 Ontario Hockey League Priority Selection.

2011 NHL Entry Draft
On June 24–25, 2011, the National Hockey League conducted the 2011 NHL Entry Draft held at the Xcel Energy Center in St. Paul, Minnesota. In total, 46 players from the Ontario Hockey League were selected in the draft. Gabriel Landeskog of the Kitchener Rangers was the first player from the OHL to be selected, as he was taken with the second overall pick by the Colorado Avalanche.

Below are the players selected from OHL teams at the NHL Entry Draft.

2011 CHL Import Draft
On June 27, 2011, the Canadian Hockey League conducted the 2011 CHL Import Draft, in which teams in all three CHL leagues participate in. The London Knights held the first pick in the draft by a team in the OHL, and selected Olli Maatta from Finland with their selection.

Below are the players who were selected in the first round by Ontario Hockey League teams in the 2011 CHL Import Draft.

See also
 2011 Memorial Cup
 List of OHL seasons
 2010–11 QMJHL season
 2010–11 WHL season
 2010 NHL Entry Draft
 List of OHA Junior A standings
 2010 in ice hockey
 2011 in ice hockey

External links
 Official website of the Ontario Hockey League
 Official website of the Canadian Hockey League
 Official website of the MasterCard Memorial Cup
 Official website of the Home Hardware Top Prospects Game
 Official website of the Subway Super Series
 Official website of the OHL All-Star Classic

References

Ontario Hockey League seasons
Ohl